WNOK (104.7 FM) is a commercial radio station licensed to Columbia, South Carolina, serving the Columbia metropolitan area and the Midlands of South Carolina.  It broadcasts a Top 40 (CHR) radio format and it's owned by iHeartMedia, Inc.  The current slogan is "The Midlands' #1 Hit Music Station."  Its radio studios are on Greystone Boulevard in Columbia, off Interstate 126, near the Riverbanks Zoo.

WNOK has an effective radiated power (ERP) of 90,000 watts.  The transmitter is in the northeast section of Columbia, off Hardscrabble Road at Lee Road.  WNOK is "short-spaced" with WKQC in Charlotte, also broadcasting on 104.7 MHz.  The two stations are only about 90 miles apart with WKQC running an ERP of 96,000 watts.  FCC rules would normally require two co-channel Class C-1 FM stations to be 152 miles apart.  Both stations use directional antennas to limit co-channel interference. The Chester and Lancaster areas of South Carolina have trouble receiving a clear signal from either station.

History

Beautiful Music
WNOK-FM signed on the air on July 15, 1959.  It was owned by the Palmetto Radio Corporation, along with WNOK 1230 AM (later WPCO) and Channel 19 WNOK-TV (now WLTX).   At that time, when few people owned FM radios, WNOK-FM mostly simulcast WNOK's middle of the road format of pop music, news and sports.

In the late 1960s, WNOK and WNOK-FM ended simulcasting.  1230 WNOK went with a Top 40 sound, while 104.7 WNOK-FM flipped to a Beautiful Music format.  It was mostly automated, playing quarter hour sweeps of instrumental cover versions of popular songs, Broadway and Hollywood show tunes.  In addition, WNOK-FM offered commercial-free instrumental background music on a subsidiary communications authority (SCA) subcarrier channel with a frequency of 23 kHz. This prevented the station from broadcasting in FM stereo because the SCA subchannel occupied part of the frequency band.  In November 1963, WNOK-FM interrupted its background music service to announce that President John Kennedy had been shot in Dallas, Texas. The announcement was heard in department stores, restaurants and offices throughout the Columbia area.

Top 40
Beginning in the mid-1970s, WNOK-FM gradually became more vocal with something of a soft adult contemporary format. The station switched to a Mainstream Top 40 sound in December 1976 as "Stereo 105" and was largely automated.  As more people acquired FM radios, the ratings for WNOK-FM began climbing through the 1970s and into the 1980s.

By 1980, the automation was done away with, replaced with live disc jockeys, and the station's name was rounded up to "105 WNOK". By early 1984, as digital tuners became more common, the station became "104.7 WNOK."  It was the first FM station in Columbia to use its actual frequency, down to the decimal place, as part of its name.

Ownership Change
In 2000, Clear Channel Communications acquired WNOK.  Several years later, Clear Channel changed its corporate name to iHeartMedia.

The company also owns Sports radio 1400 WCOS, Country music 97.5 WCOS-FM, Adult Hits 96.7 WLTY, Urban contemporary 100.1 WXBT and Talk radio 560 WVOC in the Columbia radio market.

References

External links
WNOK's website

NOK
Contemporary hit radio stations in the United States
Radio stations established in 1959
IHeartMedia radio stations